"7 Seconds" is a song composed by Youssou N'Dour, Neneh Cherry, Cameron McVey, and Jonathan Sharp. It was released in 1994 as a single performed by N'Dour and Cherry, and achieved success, reaching the number-one position in numerous countries; in France, it stayed at number one for 16 weeks, a record at the time. "7 Seconds" also won the MTV Europe Music Award for Best Song of 1994. NME magazine ranked it number 40 in their list of the 50 best songs of 1994.

Recording
All instruments on the single were produced and arranged by Swedish music producer Christian Falk, who also played bass on the track. It was included on Neneh Cherry's album Man (1996). The song is trilingual as N'Dour sings in three languages: French, English and the West African language Wolof. Cherry sings only in English. The English chorus was actually recorded by another singer as Youssou was ill during the production of the song. It also appeared on N'Dour's 1994 album The Guide (Wommat), released shortly after the single.

The title and refrain of the song refers to the first moments of a child's life; as Cherry put it, "not knowing about the problems and violence in our world". Shocked by the single's enormous commercial success, she told The Independent in an interview, "We did it as an experiment. The tune grew on its own, completely out of proportion. It was out there doing its own thing. But that is a dream when you write a song."

Chart performance
"7 Seconds" was a worldwide hit, peaking within the top 10 of the charts in several countries, including Australia, Austria, Belgium, Brazil, Germany, Ireland, the Netherlands (number two), Sweden, Paraguay and the United Kingdom. It climbed to the top position in Finland, France, Iceland, Italy and Switzerland. It stayed at number one for 16 consecutive weeks on the French Singles Chart, which was the record for the most weeks at the top position at the time. On the Eurochart Hot 100, the song reached number two. It was awarded with a gold record in Austria, France, Germany, the Netherlands, Switzerland and the United Kingdom.

Critical reception
A reviewer from Swedish newspaper Aftonbladet described the song as a "floating airy and heavenly beautiful synth ballad". Peter Stepek from AllMusic called it a "vaguely menacing duet". Larry Flick from Billboard felt that it is "unique and thoroughly pleasing", noting that "haunting tune is padded with cushiony synths and a richly soulful bass line. Cherry offers a sweet and charming contrast to N'Dour's gritty vocal." Troy J. Augusto from Cashbox wrote that the "compelling duet nicely swirls N'Dour’s husky vocals and Cherry's sweet, angelic voice into a nifty, down-tempo stroll that has broad radio potential." He added further that it is "powered by a rolling bass line and layers of passive synthesizer strains". Dave Sholin from the Gavin Report viewed the song as "music to stir the senses combined with lyrics that make a powerful case for our common humanity." He remarked that it "is especially powerful in light of recent events in South Africa and it's made that much more riveting by the melding of these two voices. Its worth spending some time with this amazing track." 

James Masterton praised it as a "gorgeous ballad" in his weekly UK chart commentary. Pan-European magazine Music & Media complimented Cherry as "again brilliant", and also complimented the song as "melodic, synthy, sexy and with a slow beat." Wendi Cermak from The Network Forty described it as "haunting". Dele Fadele from NME opined that it "makes like a future African sci-fi rumination on colour prejudice, with Yossou N'Dour's beguiling tones on show." David Sinclair from The Times wrote, "Built around a gentle boombox beat overlaid by drifting synthesizer chords, the song achieves the same seductive combination of rhythm and rumination that informed Bruce Springsteen's recent hit "Streets of Philadelphia"."

Music video
The accompanying black-and-white music video for "7 Seconds" was directed by French director, photographer, film producer and actor Stéphane Sednaoui. It features people of different ethnicities walking by while the two are singing. When they sing the chorus, different kinds of people's faces appear. The video received heavy rotation on MTV Europe and was A-listed on Germany's VIVA in August 1994.

Impact and legacy
NME magazine ranked "7 Seconds" number 40 in their list of the 50 best songs of 1994. It was included in the 2010 book 1001 Songs You Must Hear Before You Die. Eloise Parker remarked that "the soul of '7 seconds' is N'Dour's heartfelt vocals, sung in Wolof and French, enhanced by Cherry's haunting English-language chorus."

Formats and track listings

 UK CD single (660508-2)
 "7 Seconds" (radio edit)
 "7 Seconds" (LP version)
 "7 Seconds" (new old mix)
 "7 Seconds" (dub mix)
 "7 Seconds" (hip hop mix)

 US CD single (Chaos/Columbia 42K 77482)
 "7 Seconds" (album version) – 5:07
 "7 Seconds" (new old mix) – 5:44
 "7 Seconds" (hip hop mix) – 6:24
 "7 Seconds" (dub mix) – 6:08
 "Mame Bamba" by Youssou N'Dour – 5:00

 CD maxi
 "7 Seconds" – 4:10
 "Mame Bamba" by Youssou N'Dour – 4:57
 "7 Seconds" (R & B to the hip hop drop mix) – 6:24
 "7 Seconds" (Dub Mix) – 6:07

 CD maxi (7 June 1994)
 "7 Seconds" – 4:10
 "Life (Adouna)" by Youssou N'Dour – 4:57
 "7 Seconds" (R & B to the hip hop drop mix) – 6:24
 "7 Seconds" – 6:07

 CD maxi (7 June 1994)
 "7 Seconds" (radio edit) – 4:06
 "Life (Adouna)" by Youssou N'Dour – 4:02
 "7 Seconds" (R & B to the hip hop drop mix) – 6:23
 "7 Seconds" (dub mix) – 6:07

Charts

Weekly charts

Year-end charts

Certifications

See also
 List of number-one singles of 1994 (France)

References

Further reading
 

1990s ballads
1994 singles
1994 songs
Black-and-white music videos
Columbia Records singles
Male–female vocal duets
Macaronic songs
Music videos directed by Stéphane Sednaoui
Neneh Cherry songs
Number-one singles in Iceland
Number-one singles in Italy
Number-one singles in Switzerland
SNEP Top Singles number-one singles
Song recordings produced by Cameron McVey
Song recordings produced by Jonny Dollar
Songs against racism and xenophobia
Songs written by Cameron McVey
Songs written by Jonny Dollar
Songs written by Neneh Cherry
Wolof language
Youssou N'Dour songs